Mathra is a village in Kollam district in the Indian state of Kerala, located near the town of Punalur. It is the  headquarters of Mathra Grama Panchayat, a fertile area in which many residents are engaged in farming.. It is surrounded by hills, and several streams flow through village.

Mathra is a big village constituting many temples, including Mathra Ayiravalli Temple (Lord Shiva) and Paravathi Devi Temple. It also has one school - Saraswathi Villasam School. Mathra Service Co-operative Bank is a large cooperative bank in the district. The village has a large NRI population. Most of the needs of the village are contributed by the nearby town Punalur. Jai bharath library is a cultural centre in Mathra.

Transport
Many Kerala State Road Transport Corporation buses ply through Mathra, connecting village to Punalur and other nearby places. Private vehicles including jeeps and autos also connect Mathra to Punalur.

References

Villages in Kollam district